Susan Nirah Jaffee is an American screenwriter and television producer, primary working on sit-coms, and, as at 2007, serving as a writer and producer for Desperate Housewives.

Beginning as an episode writer and story editor for Cybill in 1997, and remaining on the show for its last two seasons, she later worked as an executive story editor for Sex and the City, and a writer for Movie Stars, Maybe It's Me, and One on One, the later which she also produced.

In 2006, she joined the crew of Desperate Housewives as a supervising producer and writer for the third season of the show.

External links
 

American soap opera writers
American screenwriters
Year of birth missing (living people)
Living people
American television producers
American women television producers
American women television writers
American women screenwriters
Women soap opera writers
21st-century American women